Birthday Blues is a 1932 Our Gang short comedy film directed by Robert F. McGowan.  It was the 118th (31st talking episode) Our Gang short that was released.

Plot
When their pennypinching father refuses to buy a birthday gift for their long-suffering mother, brothers Dickie and Spanky decide to purchase a gift for Mom on their own. Unfortunately, the "late 1922 model" dress they have selected is beyond their price range (a daunting $1.98); thus, acting upon the advice of Stymie, Dickie and Spanky decide to bake a cake with hidden prizes, then auction off the cake at ten cents a slice.

The party turns out to be a mess and Spanky's and Dickie's father returns to find it. He throws the gang and other kids out of the house and then gives Dickie a severe spanking. When Dad finds out that Dickie is using the money to buy Mom a dress, he abruptly changes his attitude. However, Dad feels the dress that Dickie bought is too fancy for Mom to wear to church on Sunday morning, but Mom proudly wears the one Dickie and Spanky picked out, to the crowd's amusement.

Cast

The Gang
 Dickie Moore as Dickie
 Matthew Beard as Stymie
 Dorothy DeBorba as Dorothy
 Kendall McComas as Breezy Brisbane
 George McFarland as Spanky
 Bobbie Beard as "Stymie"
 Jackie Lyn Dufton as Jacquie
 Pete the Pup as himself

Additional cast
 Carlena Beard as Party guest with fake snake
 Georgie Billings as Party guest with powder in mouth
 Edith Fellows as Party guest with string in mouth
 Douglas Greer as Party guest squirted by liquid
 Donald Haines as Tough party guest
 Dickie Jackson as Party guest with bubbles in mouth
 Mildred Kornman as Party guest
 Marcia Mae Jones as Party guest with whistle
 Bobby Mallon as Party guest with liquid in mouth
 Hooper Atchley as John, the father
 Harry Bernard as Store proprietor
 Gordon Douglas as Delivery boy
 Lillian Rich as Lillian, the mother

Notes
The film was edited by about 5 minutes from the Little Rascals syndicated television package in 1971 due to perceived racism toward African Americans. The episode was fully reinstated on AMC from 2001 to 2003.

See also
 Our Gang filmography

References

External links
 
 

1932 films
American black-and-white films
Films directed by Robert F. McGowan
Hal Roach Studios short films
1932 comedy films
Our Gang films
1932 short films
1930s American films